Omsica is a village in Croatia.

Population

According to the 2011 census, Omsica had 12 inhabitants.

Napomena: Till 1900 name of the settlement was Omšica.

1991 census

According to the 1991 census, settlement of Omsica had 135 inhabitants, which were ethnically declared as this:

Austro-hungarian 1910 census

According to the 1910 census, settlement of Omsica had 455 inhabitants in 3 hamlets, which were linguistically and religiously declared as this:

Literature 

  Savezni zavod za statistiku i evidenciju FNRJ i SFRJ, popis stanovništva 1948, 1953, 1961, 1971, 1981. i 1991. godine.
 Knjiga: "Narodnosni i vjerski sastav stanovništva Hrvatske, 1880–1991: po naseljima, author: Jakov Gelo, izdavač: Državni zavod za statistiku Republike Hrvatske, 1998., ;

References

External links

Populated places in Zadar County
Lika